Andre Boe (born 24 October 1962) is a Cameroonian former footballer who is last known to have played as a goalkeeper for Molesey. He was known for his unorthodox style and attention-grabbing antics on the field where he "sometimes played more like an outfield player".

Club career

In early 1996, Boe appeared in three league matches for Scottish second division side Greenock Morton as a short-term replacement for an injured David Wylie. He made his debut with the team on 24 February, keeping a clean sheet in a 2–0 win over Dumbarton where he memorably stood near the half-way line and waved to the crowd in the first half. After that, he played for Molesey in the English seventh division but left due to "cultural reasons".

International career
He reportedly earned 62 caps for the Cameroon national team, although that number has been disputed.

References

External links
 
 Greenock Morton stats

Living people
1962 births
Cameroonian footballers
Cameroon international footballers
Association football goalkeepers
Greenock Morton F.C. players
Molesey F.C. players
Isthmian League players
Cameroonian expatriate footballers
Cameroonian expatriate sportspeople in Scotland
Cameroonian expatriate sportspeople in England
Expatriate footballers in Scotland
Expatriate footballers in England